The Afula mall bombing was a terrorist attack which occurred on May 19, 2003  in which a Palestinian suicide bomber blew herself up outside the "Shaarei HaAmakim" mall in Afula, Israel, killing 3 Israelis and injuring 70. 

Both the Islamic Jihad and the Al Aqsa Martyrs Brigades claimed responsibility for the attack.

The attack

On Monday, May 19, 2003 at 17:14 pm, a Palestinian suicide bomber approached the entrance to the "Shaarei HaAmakim" mall in the city of Afula in northern Israel. The suicide bomber detonated the explosives hidden underneath her clothes when she approached the security the guards at the entrance for the security inspection. Three people were killed in the attack (two security guards and a shopper) and 70 people were injured.

The perpetrators 
After the attack, both the Islamic Jihad and the Al Aqsa Martyrs Brigades claimed responsibility for the attack and stated that the suicide bomber was a 19-year-old Palestinian female named Hiba Daraghmeh from the city Tubas in the northeastern West Bank who was an English literature student.

See also
Palestinian political violence

References

External links 
Suicide bombing in Afula (May 19, 2003) – published at the Israeli Ministry of Foreign Affairs
 Suicide blast rocks Israeli mall – published on BBC News on May 19, 2003
 Homicide Bomber Kills Three in Israel – published on Fox News on May 20, 2003
 Shopping Mall Suicide Blast – published on Sky News on May 20, 2003
 Peace plan at risk as fifth bomber strikes – published on The Age on May 21, 2003
 Woman Suicide Bomber Kills 3 – published on CBS News on May 20, 2003

Terrorist attacks attributed to Palestinian militant groups
Suicide bombing in the Israeli–Palestinian conflict
Terrorist incidents in Israel in 2003
May 2003 events in Asia
2003 murders in Israel
Suicide bombings in 2003
Shopping mall bombings
Islamic terrorism in Israel